Iván Moreno (born 26 February 1989 in Cadiz) is a Spanish Grand Prix motorcycle racer.

Career statistics

By season

Races by year
(key)

References

External links

1989 births
Living people
Moto2 World Championship riders
Moto3 World Championship riders
Spanish motorcycle racers